The Tropicana LRT station is a provisional light rapid transit (LRT) station station that is slated to serve the suburb of Tropicana, Selangor, Malaysia once it is built. It serves as one of the stations on the Shah Alam line. The station is located near Menara Lien Hoe and New Klang Valley Expressway.

References

External links
 LRT3 Bandar Utama–Klang line

Rapid transit stations in Selangor
Shah Alam Line